Gymnothorax rueppelliae, the banded moray, banded reef-eel, Rüppell's moray, Rüppell's moray eel, black barred eel, yellow-headed moray eel or yellow-headed moray, is a moray eel found in tropical coral reefs. Gymnothorax rueppelliae is a pale grey to greyish-brown moray with 16-21 dark bars on the body, a bright yellow head and a dark spot at the corner of the mouth. They differ from the Gymnothorax pikei, a close relative that lives Papua New Guinea. They have fewer vomerine teeth. They also reach a maximum length of 80 cm.

Distribution, Habitat & Diet 
They can be found in lagoons and reefs from the Red Sea and East Africa to Hawaii, Tuamotu, the Marquesas Islands, North of the Ryukyu Islands and South of the Great Barrier Reef.

These eels are nocturnal and live at 1–40 m depth. They feed on fish, crabs, and shrimp.

References

External links
 

rueppelliae
Marine fish of Northern Australia
Fish described in 1844